NFL is the National Football League, the highest-level professional American football league in the United States.

NFL may also refer to:

Football leagues

National Football League (India), the former top league for Indian association football
 National Football League (Ireland), a Gaelic football league organized by the GAA in Ireland
 National Football League (South Africa), a South African football league organised for whites-only during the apartheid era
 Singapore Football League formerly named Singapore National Football League, an amateur competition for clubs that are affiliated with the Football Association of Singapore

Places
 Newfoundland and Labrador, a province of Canada on the country's Atlantic coast in northeastern North America
 Northfleet railway station, Kent, England (National Rail station code)
 "North Florida," also known as First Coast

Businesses and organizations
 The Amtrak code for the Niagara Falls, New York (Amtrak station)
 National Fertilizers Limited, an Indian chemical company
 National Forensic League, a non-profit speech and debate association
 National Front for Liberation, an armed Syrian rebel coalition
 Northumberland Ferries Limited, a ferry company operating in eastern Canada

Science and technology
 Neurofilament light polypeptide, a biomarker that reflects axonal damage
 No Free Lunch as used in the no free lunch in search and optimization
 Not Foot Launchable - the name of a Pterodactyl Ascender aircraft design
The no free lunch theorem, a mathematical folklore

Arts and entertainment 

 Efilnikufesin (N.F.L.), a song by American metal band Anthrax
 NFL (video game), a 1989 football video game for the NES
NFL (video game series), a football series started in 2008

Other
 ISO code for Äiwoo language, of the Solomon Islands

See also
 National Football League (disambiguation)
 Northern Football League (disambiguation)